Certified Social Engineering Prevention Specialist (CSEPS) refers to both an individual Mitnick Security Consulting certification and a broader professional certification program.

The CSEPS program currently offers one type of certification. To attain this certification, a candidate must attend a CSEPS training course and pass the exam proctored at completion.

The training program focuses primarily on how Social Engineering works through the use of numerous case histories and a detailed breakdown of the psychological principles related to influence. It more specifically focuses on how a malicious hacker or information thief uses Social Engineering and/or Pretexting to obtain illicit access to computer systems by duping employees, and what can be done to minimize social engineering based attacks in an organization.

The course and exam costs approximately US$2300.00 per person. The course is two days in length. The exams takes between 1 and 2 hours to complete and consists of between 50-90 multiple choice questions and an essay section dealing with specific actions taken to prevent Social Engineering in a proposed scenario.

The exam was first designed by Kevin Mitnick and Alexis Kasperavičius in 2004, with assistance from various experts in the psychology field.

External links
 CSEPS Course outline from MitnickSecurity.com

Professional titles and certifications
Information technology qualifications